Special group may refer to:

Group of people 
 Special Group (India), a secretive special forces unit of Indian intelligence.
 Special Groups (Iraq), insurgent groups operating within Iraq.
 Special Groups (Portugal), small military units, set up by the Portuguese Armed Forces in Angola and in Mozambique.
 NSC 5412/2 Special Group, a subcommittee of the United States National Security Council responsible for coordinating government covert operations.
 Special forces, specialist military units.

Mathematics 
 Special group (algebraic group theory) is a linear algebraic group such that every principal G-bundle is locally trivial
 Special group (finite group theory) is a type of finite groups of prime power order
 Special Lie groups are Lie groups of matrices with determinant 1:
 Special linear group
 Special orthogonal group
 Special unitary group
 Special affine group